Dacrydium leptophyllum is a species of conifer in the family Podocarpaceae. It is found only in Indonesia.

References

leptophyllum
Vulnerable plants
Taxonomy articles created by Polbot